Spårvägens GoIF, Stockholms Spårvägars Gymnastik och Idrottsförening, was founded in 1919 by employees of Stockholms Spårvägar under the name Stockholms Spårvägspersonals GoIF. Today the club has 15 departments of sports and a total of 5,500 members. Once it competed in 18 sports.

In 1946, swimming was added to the programme and in 1969 football was added to the programme.

Sections
Athletics - Spårvägens FK
Badminton - Spårvägen Badminton
Bandy - Spårvägen Bandy
Bowling - Spårvägen Bowling
Cycling - Spårvägens CK
Football (soccer) - Spårvägens FF
Handball - Spårvägens HF
Orienteering - Spårvägens OK
Skiing - Spårvägens SK
Swimming - Spårvägens SF
Table tennis - Spårvägen Bordtennis
Tennis - Spårvägen Tennis
Weightlifting - Spårvägen Tyngdlyftning
Volleyball - Spårvägens VBK
Wrestling - Spårvägen Brottning

References

Sports teams in Sweden
Sports clubs established in 1919
Sport in Stockholm
Orienteering clubs in Sweden